Nedeljković (Cyrillic script: Недељковић) is a Serbian patronymic surname derived from a masculine given name Nedeljko. It may refer to:

Aleksandar Nedeljković (born 1982), footballer
Alex Nedeljkovic (born 1996), American professional ice hockey player
Bogoljub Nedeljković (1920–1986), politician
Goran Nedeljković (born 1982), rower
Ivan Nedeljković (born 1978), footballer
Milorad Nedeljković (1883–1961), politician
Nikola Nedeljković (born 1996), footballer
Ozren Nedeljković (1903–1984), chess master
Petar Nedeljković (1882–1955), general
Silvija Nedeljković (born 1984), singer
Srećko Nedeljković (1923–2011), chess master
Verica Nedeljković (born 1929), chess master

Serbian surnames
Patronymic surnames